Cosmosoma orathidia is a moth of the subfamily Arctiinae. It was described by Herbert Druce in 1898. It is found in Nicaragua.

References

orathidia
Moths described in 1898